Ribarevine, meaning place of fishermen in Older Slavic, is the name of a major crossroads in Montenegro, based in the north of the country in the Bijelo Polje municipality. Situated close to Bijelo Polje, it connects the northern Montenegrin towns of Bijelo Polje, Pljevlja and Žabljak with both southern Montenegro (Podgorica and the sea), and northeastern Montenegro (Berane district), hence the border crossings into Serbia including Kosovo.

Demographics
According to the 2011 census, its population was 383.

References

Populated places in Bijelo Polje Municipality